Oru Indhiya Kanavu is a 1983 Indian Tamil-language film written and directed by Komal Swaminathan. It is based on his play of the same name. The film stars Rajeev, Suhasini and Lalitha, with Poornam Viswanathan in a supporting role. The film was critically acclaimed and won the National Film Award for Best Feature Film in Tamil at the 31st National Film Awards in 1984.

Plot 
Anamika, a post-graduate student, along with her friends visit the Javadi Hills to make a study on the tribals who live there. During her stay, she befriends a tribal girl named Gangamma. Upon returning home, she wishes to do something for uplifting the lives of the people. She is encouraged in this regard by her father, and Agni, a journalist. After a while, Anamika goes to Javadi Hills and gets to know that Gangamma is dead. She learns that Gangamma killed herself after being raped. A frustrated Anamika sets out to inquire the local people. In the process, she is accompanied by a police officer named Muthuvel. Further inquiry reveals Gangamma was raped by Dhanapal, son of an influential minister Malaiyappar.

Anamika gathers some evidence against Dhanapal and goes to the city and approaches Agni and other journalists to publish the news. When the news get published, Malaiyappar is asked to step down by the chief minister. However, Malaiayappar refuses to resign and further blackmails the chief minister of another issue. The case against Dhanapal becomes weak and Muthuvel is transferred to another city. Anamika and father are arrested under the National Protection Act for disturbing peace and security in the locality. Muthivel resigns his job and joins Anamika in her struggle to seek justice for Gangamma.

Cast 
Rajeev as Muthuvel
Suhasini as Anamika
Lalitha as Gangamma
Poornam Viswanathan as Agni
Vathiyar Raman as U. K. Gangatharan, also Anamika's father
Santhanam P as Malaiyappar
Murali C. Acharya as Dhanapal

Production 
Oru Indhiya Kanavu was based on the play of the same name by Komal Swaminathan himself. The communist parties screened the play in almost all parts of Tamil Nadu. At one time, it was reported to have been witnessed by over 7,000 people.

Soundtrack 
Soundtrack was composed by M. S. Viswanathan.

Release 
Oru Indhiya Kanavu was released on 30 September 1983 to widespread critical acclaim. At the 31st National Film Awards, it won the National Film Award for Best Feature Film in Tamil. The film was also screened at the Soviet Union where a reviewer "attributed the reformist nature of the film to the progressive strivings of its filmmaker". Kalki said Swaminathan took a problematic story and directed it with clarity.

References

Bibliography

External links 
 

1980s Tamil-language films
1983 films
Best Tamil Feature Film National Film Award winners
Films scored by M. S. Viswanathan
Indian films based on plays